The Provisional Committee of the State Duma  was a special government body established on March 12, 1917 (27 February O.S.) by the Fourth State Duma deputies at the outbreak of the February Revolution in the same year. It was formed under the jurisdiction of the Russian Provisional Government, established immediately after the abdication of Nicholas II.

The committee declared itself the governing body of Russian Empire, but de facto competed for power with the Petrograd Soviet, which was created on the same day. The Government of Golitzine as the Council of Ministers of Russian Empire retreated to the Admiralty building. The committee of the State Duma appointed 24 commissars to head various state ministries replacing the Imperial Government. According to Milyukov Chkheidze never participated in the work of the committee.

On March 15 (March 2 O.S.) the committee and the Petrograd Soviet agreed to create the Provisional Government. Many members of the committee went on to serve in the Provisional Government, while the committee continued to play an insignificant role until the Fourth Duma was dissolved on September 19 (September 6 O.S.).

References

Government of the Russian Empire
Ministers of the Russian Provisional Government
Russian Revolution
Russian Provisional Government